Magdalen College School may refer to:
Magdalen College School, Oxford, Oxfordshire
Magdalen College School, Brackley, Northamptonshire
Magdalen College School, Wainfleet, Lincolnshire

See also
Magdalen College (disambiguation)